"" ("We all want to be merry", freely: "Rejoice we all this Easter-tide!") is a German Easter hymn, with a text mostly by Cyriakus Schneegass, who added to an older first stanza, and a 1544 tune by the Bohemian Brethren. It was published in Wittenberg in 1573.

History 
The first stanza of "" was written in the 14th century in Medingen Abbey, a nuns' monastery. The following four stanzas were added by Cyriakus Schneegass in Eisleben. The melody appears first in a Bohemian monastery in Hohenfurt, another sources says "Böhmische Brüder 1544" (Bohemian Brethren 1544). It was printed in Wittenberg in 1573. It has appeared in German-language hymnals, including in the Protestant hymnal Evangelisches Gesangbuch as EG 100, and in the Catholic hymnal Gotteslob as GL 326.

References

External links 
 Wir wollen alle fröhlich sein (Michael Praetorius) ChoralWiki

16th-century hymns in German
Easter hymns